Muhos railway station is a railway station in the municipality of Muhos in the Northern Ostrobothnia region in Finland on the Oulu–Kontiomäki railway line. It is the second station east from Oulu railway station and the first passenger service station east from Oulu. The station was opened in 1927, and it was a staffed station until in 1998 when centralized traffic control was installed.

Passenger and freight service
Passenger trains are operated by the national railway operator VR Group. There are eight daily passenger trains stopping at Muhos, four westbound and four eastbound.

As of 2007 there is no freight service available in Muhos.

Railyard
There is also a fourth track, a  spur track alongside a loading platform. This fourth track is the southernmost track and only accessible from the east end.

External links
 

Muhos
Railway stations in North Ostrobothnia
Railway stations opened in 1927